Rohnert Park is the third studio album by San Francisco Bay Area hardcore punk band Ceremony. Named after the band's hometown in Rohnert Park, California, the 13-track LP is their first full-length release after a series of high-profile tours, including their March 2009 tour with Converge and January 2010 tour with A.F.I.

Critical reception

The album generally received positive reviews from critics. Metroactive critic Gabe Meline wrote: "Whereas most hardcore bands push to extremes of speed, spectacle and spazz, Ceremony deal in the rare commodity of restraint and show that the original genius of punk rock—letting urgency and purpose carry technically unvarnished music—is alive and well." John Gentile of Punknews.org stated: "Throughout Rohnert Park, Ceremony keeps throwing curveballs that don't feel like curveballs at all--they drop in unusual elements, but these strange pieces feel completely natural alongside their more traditional material." Redefine magazine critic Peter Woodburn thought that "Rohnert Park is a great album that meanders a bit at times but quickly blasts itself back on track." Adam Thomas of Sputnikmusic stated that "goes beyond making a statement, it reaffirms the continued survival of punk in not only this decade, but the decade after, and the decade after that."

Track listing

Personnel
Ross Farrar – vocals
Anthony Anzaldo – guitars
Ryan Mattos – guitars
Justin Davis – bass
Jake Casarotti – drums

Technical personnel
Recorded, mixed, produced by Dan Rathbun

References

External links

2010 albums
Bridge 9 Records albums
Ceremony (punk band) albums